Jangal District is a district (bakhsh) in Roshtkhar County, Razavi Khorasan Province, Iran. At the 2006 census, its population was 14,626, in 3,298 families.  The District has one city: Jangal.  The District has two rural districts (dehestan): Jangal Rural District and Shabeh Rural District.

References 

Districts of Razavi Khorasan Province
Roshtkhar County